Taughannock Falls State Park is a  state park located in the town of Ulysses in Tompkins County, New York in the United States.  The park is northwest of Ithaca near Trumansburg.

The park's namesake, Taughannock Falls, is a  plunge waterfall that is the highest single-drop waterfall east of the Rocky Mountains.

History
The region surrounding Taughannock Falls State Park was home to the Cayuga people prior to their displacement from the area during the Clinton-Sullivan Campaign following the American Revolutionary War. Taughannock Creek was used as a source of power for mills and a gun factory in the early 19th century.

Tourism

During the second half of the nineteenth century, steamboats, railroads and Victorian hotels were built in the region to serve tourists who traveled to view the falls. By 1925 the hotels were failing due to a decline in tourism, and New York State began acquiring land to form a park.

J.S. Halsey built a two and a half story hotel in 1850, known variously as the Cataract Hotel or Taughannock House (or simply as Halsey's Hotel) at the Taughannock Falls Overlook.  Visitors could reach the hotel by taking a train to Cayuga Lake, take a steamboat across the lake to Goodwin's Point, then finally board a stagecoach to reach the hotel. The hotel site today is the location of the park visitor center and parking lot.

The Taughannock Giant

On July 2, 1879, workmen widening a carriage road near the Taughannock House Hotel uncovered what appeared to be the petrified body of a seven-foot-tall man. Newspapers reported on the find, and Cornell University scientists removed parts of the body for examination. Over 5,000 people paid a small admission fee to view the 800-pound "giant." Before long, the figure was revealed to be a hoax created by the hotel's owner, John Thompson, and two associates. The idea for the hoax had been inspired by the Cardiff Giant, a similar "discovery" in nearby Cardiff, New York in 1869. Although the original giant has been damaged and lost, a replica was constructed for the Tompkins Center for History & Culture by local artists in 2019.

An earlier publicity stunt masterminded by Thompson in 1874 involved hiring Canadian acrobat "Professor Jenkins" to cross a 1,200-foot-long tightrope suspended 350 feet above the creek. He was reported to have crossed twice over two days, at least one of those times while blindfolded and wearing "Chinese wooden shoes." Jenkins had previously crossed Niagara Falls gorge.

State park
Taughannock Falls State Park was created in 1925 on a  parcel of land acquired by New York State. Roads and trails at the park were improved by the Works Progress Administration in the 1930s.

Origin of name
Several possible sources have been proposed for the name Taughannock, all of which describe Native American origins. One translation suggests that the name is derived from a combination of Iroquois and Algonquin terms meaning "great fall in the woods". An alternate theory suggests that the name may refer to a Lenni Lenape (Delaware) chief named Taughannock who died near the falls during a battle.

Park description

Taughannock Falls State Park offers hiking and nature trails, camping and picnicking. The park includes a stretch of Cayuga Lake's shoreline, where swimming, fishing, and a boat launch are available. In the winter, the park offers facilities and trails for ice-skating, sledding, and cross-country skiing.

In addition to the  Taughannock Falls, two additional waterfalls are located along Taughannock Creek within the park. A  cascade, known as Little or Lower Falls, is located downstream of Taughannock Falls, while the  Upper Falls are found upstream of Taughannock Falls.

Views of Taughannock Falls are available from two trails. The  Gorge Trail leads to a viewing area at the base of the falls and also passes by Lower Falls. The  North Rim Trail and  South Rim Trail can be connected to form a loop hike which offers views of Upper Falls.

The Gorge Trail is open all year long, unlike the Rim Trails which are closed to the public in winter. Swimming under the waterfall is hazardous and strictly forbidden.

Taughannock Falls

It is the tallest single-drop waterfall east of the Rocky Mountains.

Geology and natural history
The waterfall and gorge comprise an example of a hanging valley, formed where Taughannock Creek's stream-carved valley meets the deeper glacially carved valley that contains Cayuga Lake. The gorge has continued to retreat westward from Cayuga Lake as easily eroded shale near the fall's base is worn away by the stream, which supports erosion-resistant siltstone and sandstone found in the upper portions of the gorge. Annual freeze and thaw cycles also act upon small faults in the rock, causing large sections to occasionally break away, further expanding the gorge.

The gorge supports a "Shale Cliff and Talus" community of plants, including three regionally rare species classified as threatened in New York State: Butterwort (Pinguicula vulgaris), birds-eye primrose (Primula mistassinica) and  yellow mountain saxifrage (Saxifraga aizoides).

See also
List of New York state parks
List of waterfalls of New York

References

Further reading

External links

 New York State Parks: Taughannock Falls State Park
 taughannock.us: Taughannock Falls State Park
 Taughannock Falls State Park map
 Video about the Taughannock House Hotel

State parks of New York (state)
Parks in Tompkins County, New York
Protected areas established in 1925
1925 establishments in New York (state)
Glens of the United States
Waterfalls of New York (state)